Michał Kałwa (born 9 August 1978) is a Polish alpine skier. He competed in four events at the 2006 Winter Olympics.

References

External links
 

1978 births
Living people
Polish male alpine skiers
Olympic alpine skiers of Poland
Alpine skiers at the 2006 Winter Olympics
Sportspeople from Poznań
21st-century Polish people